Straight from the Shoulder is a Philippine television and radio public affairs show broadcast by GMA Network. Hosted by Louie Beltran, it premiered in 1970 on MBC-11 until in 1972. On January 14, 1987, it returned as a television show in GMA Network. A radio edition also aired on DZRH. The show concluded in September 1994, following Beltran's death. It was replaced by Liberty Live with Joe Taruc in its timeslot.

Accolades

References

1970 Philippine television series debuts
1972 Philippine television series endings
1987 Philippine television series debuts
1994 Philippine television series endings
Filipino-language television shows
GMA Network original programming
GMA Integrated News and Public Affairs shows
Philippine television shows